The 2017 Botswana earthquake was a magnitude 6.5 earthquake which occurred in the Central District of Botswana.

It is the second largest earthquake recorded in Botswana next to the 6.7 magnitude earthquake in Maun which occurred in 1952.

Earthquake
The earthquake which happened at 19:40, local time according to the US Geological Survey. It was felt for 30 seconds in the country's capital of Gaborone and was reportedly felt in neighboring South Africa, Zimbabwe, and Swaziland. At least 36 students were injured in a stampede sparked by the earthquake.

Geology 
The epicenter area of the earthquake is covered by wind-blown sediments and there is no trace of a fault at the surface prior to the earthquake. The phenomenon was suspected to be an artificial earthquake allegedly caused by hydraulic fracking activity in the Central Kalahari Game Reserve. Geophysical investigation of the epicenter region show that the earthquake is natural, related to deep mantle fluids moving up the crust and causing the extensional reactivation of an ancient thrust fault. Slip along a low-angle segment of the fault caused a slight ground deformation at the surface detectable only by satellite radar technology.

See also
List of earthquakes in 2017
Geology of Botswana

References

External links
2017 Botswana earthquake by the United States Geological Survey

Botswana earthquake
Earthquakes in Botswana
2017 in Botswana
April 2017 events in Africa